The 2017 Atlanta mayoral election occurred on November 7, 2017, with a runoff election held on December 5, 2017.  Incumbent mayor Kasim Reed, a member of the Democratic Party who had been in office since 2010, was ineligible to run for reelection due to term limits.

A total of 14 candidates qualified for the November 7 non-partisan election.  However, no candidate revived a majority, so a runoff was held between Keisha Lance Bottoms and Mary Norwood, the top two finishers, on December 5.  On election night, unofficial results suggested that Keisha Lance Bottoms had narrowly won, but Norwood called for a recount.

The election was first certified on December 11, 2017, and had Bottoms winning by a margin of 823 votes.  This margin was less than the 1 percent threshold needed to avoid a mandatory recount.  The recount, which occurred on December 14, resulted in Norwood gaining five votes and Bottoms losing six in Fulton County, while the vote totals in DeKalb County remained the same.  The election was re-certified on December 17 after Fulton County accepted the new results.  Norwood officially conceded the race on December 21, and Lance Bottoms was inaugurated as the 60th mayor of Atlanta on January 2, 2018.

Candidates

Declared
 Peter Aman, former Chief Operating Officer of Atlanta
 Rohit Ammanamanchi, Georgia Institute of Technology graduate
 Keisha Lance Bottoms, Atlanta City Councilmember (District 11)
 John Eaves, Fulton County Chairman, District 7, At-Large
 Vincent Fort, Georgia State Senator 
 Kwanza Hall, Atlanta City Councilmember (District 2)
 Laban King, co-founder of the real estate investment firm, Millennial Global Investments
 Ceasar Mitchell, Atlanta City Council President
 Mary Norwood, Atlanta City Councilmember (Post 2 At Large) and candidate for Mayor in 2009
 Cathy Woolard, former Atlanta City Council President
 Glenn Wrightson

Failed to qualify 
 Alex Barrella, cartoonist

Dropped out
 Al Bartell, Certified Mediator. Dropped out August 22, 2017.
 Margaret Kaiser, Georgia State Representative, District 59, 2007–2016. Dropped out October 25, 2016.
 Michael Sterling, former Executive Director of the City of Atlanta Workforce Development Agency. Dropped out October 24, 2017

Endorsements

Polling

Results

General election

Runoff

See also
 Mayor of Atlanta
 2017 United States elections

References

External links
Campaign official websites
Campaign website for Peter Aman
Campaign website for Alex Barrella
Campaign website for Keisha Lance Bottoms
Campaign website for John Eaves
Campaign website for Vincent Fort
Campaign website for Kwanza Hall
Campaign website for Laban King
Campaign website for Ceasar Mitchell
Campaign website for Mary Norwood
Campaign website for Michael Sterling
Campaign website for Cathy Woolard

2017
Atlanta
Atlanta
Atlanta
2017 in Atlanta